Mangrove restoration is the regeneration of mangrove forest ecosystems in areas where they have previously existed. The practice of mangrove restoration is grounded in the discipline of restoration ecology, which aims to “[assist] the recovery of resilience and adaptive capacity of ecosystems that have been degraded, damaged, or destroyed”. Since environmental impacts are an ongoing threat, to successfully restore an ecosystem implies not merely to recreate its former condition, but to strengthen its capacity to adapt to change over time. Mangrove forests are most likely to thrive in the upper half of the intertidal zone.  If planted below the mean tide level, or subject to too great a sea level rise, they may fail to thrive.  Success will also depend on the species chosen and their suitability to conditions.

Environmental context
Mangrove forests, along with the animal species they shelter, represent globally significant sources of biodiversity and provide humanity with valuable ecosystem services. They are used by mammals, reptiles and migratory birds as feeding and breeding grounds, and provide crucial habitats for fish and crustacean species of commercial importance. The Atlantic goliath grouper for instance, which is currently listed as critically endangered due to overfishing, utilizes mangroves as a nursery for the first 5–6 years of life.  The roots of the mangrove physically buffer shorelines from the erosive impacts of ocean waves and storms. Additionally, they protect riparian zones by absorbing floodwaters and slowing down the flow of sediment-loaded river water. This allows sediments to drop to the bottom where they are held in place, thus containing potentially toxic waste products and improving the quality of water and sanitation in coastal communities.

To the human communities who rely on them, mangrove forests represent local sources of sustainable income from the harvest of fish and timber, as well as non-timber forest products such as medicinal plants, palm leaves and honey. On a global scale, they have been shown to sequester carbon in quantities comparable to higher-canopy terrestrial rainforests, which means that they may play a role in climate change mitigation, in addition to physically protecting coastlines from the projected sea-level rise associated with climate change.

However, there are limits to the capacity of mangroves to adapt to climate change. It is projected that a 1-meter rise in sea level could inundate and destroy mangrove forests in many regions around the globe, which would leave coastal communities vulnerable to the risks of flooding, shoreline erosion, saline intrusion and increased storm activity.

Mangrove loss and degradation
The issue of restoration is critical today since mangrove forests are being lost very quickly – at an even faster rate than tropical rainforests inland. A recent estimate puts the total mangrove area worldwide in 2005 at 152,000 km2 – down from 188,000 km2 in 1980. In other words, some 36,000 km2, or nearly 20% of the world's mangroves, were lost over a period of twenty-five years. Other estimates of loss may differ due to having been drawn from a smaller pool of data. The Millennium Ecosystem Assessment estimates the total loss worldwide at 35% between 1980 and 2000, but this result was drawn from data on only slightly more than half of the total mangrove area. Much of this lost mangrove area was destroyed to make room for industry, housing and tourism development; for aquaculture, primarily shrimp farms; and for agriculture, such as rice paddies, livestock pasture and salt production. Other drivers of mangrove forest destruction include activities that divert their sources of freshwater, such as groundwater withdrawals, the building of dams, and the building of roads and drainage canals across tidal flats.

Mangrove restoration
Mangroves are sensitive ecosystems, changing dynamically in response to storms, sediment blockage, and fluctuations in sea level  and present a “moving target” for restoration efforts. Different restoration approaches face this challenge in different ways. The most common method simply consists in planting single-species stands of mangroves in areas thought to be suitable, without consideration of whether or not they supported mangroves in the past. This approach usually fails over the long term because the underlying soil and hydrological requirements of the mangroves are not being met.

More informed methods aim to bring a damaged mangrove area back into its preexisting condition, taking into account not only ecosystem factors but also social, cultural and political perspectives. These approaches begin with the understanding that a damaged mangrove area may be able to repair itself through the natural processes of secondary succession, without being physically planted, provided that its tidal and freshwater hydrology is functioning normally and there is an adequate supply of seedlings. If natural renewal does occur, Twilley et al. 1996 predicts species composition will be largely determined by the very earliest saplings to colonise the recovering stand. This prediction is supported by the actual studies of Clarke et al. 2000, Clarke et al. 2001, Ross et al. 2006 and Sousa et al. 2007.

Taking this into account, it becomes crucial to the success of a restoration project to evaluate what the hydrology of a disturbed mangrove site should look like under normal conditions, and the ways in which it has been modified.
One example of this approach is the Ecological Mangrove Restoration method  which recommends the following steps, to be undertaken using healthy mangroves of the surrounding area as a reference: 
 Assess the ecology, especially reproduction and distribution patterns, of the mangrove species at the disturbed site; 
 Map the topographical elevations and hydrological patterns that determine how seedlings should establish themselves at the site; 
 Assess the changes made to the site that currently prevent the site from recovering by itself; 
 Design a restoration plan that begins by restoring the normal range of elevations and tidal hydrology at the site; and 
 Monitor the site to determine if the restoration has been successful in light of the original objectives. 
This may include introducing structures such as detached breakwaters, to protect the site from wave action and allow for adequate sediment build-up. The actual planting of seedlings is a last resort, since it fails in many cases; it should be considered only if natural recruitment of seedlings fails to reach the restoration objective.

Restoring mangroves by traditional methods, manually, is slow and difficult work. An alternative has been proposed to use quadcopters to carry and deposit seed pods. According to Irina Fedorenko and Susan Graham of BioCarbon Engineering, a drone can do an amount of work in days that is equivalent to weeks of planting by humans using traditional methods, at a fraction of the cost. Drones can also carry and plant seeds in difficult-to-reach or dangerous areas where humans cannot work easily. Drones can be used to develop planting patterns for areas and to monitor growth of new forests.

Mangroves as climate change mitigation 

Mangrove forests have a potential to mitigate climate change, such as through the sequestration of carbon from the atmosphere directly, and by providing protection from storms, which are expected to become more intense and frequent into the 21st century. A summary of coastal wetland carbon, including mangroves, is seen in the accompanying image.  
Wetland plants, like mangroves, take in carbon dioxide when they perform photosynthesis. They then convert this into biomass made of complex carbon compounds. Being the most carbon-rich tropical forest, mangroves are highly productive and are found to store three to four times more carbon than other tropical forests. This is known as blue carbon. Mangroves make up only 0.7% of tropical forest area worldwide, yet studies calculate the effect of mangrove deforestation to contribute 10% of global CO2 emissions from deforestation. The image to the right shows the global distribution of above ground carbon from mangroves. As can be seen, most of this carbon is located in Indonesia, followed by Brazil, Malaysia and Nigeria. Indonesia has one of the highest rates of mangrove loss, yet the most carbon stored from mangroves. Therefore, it is suggested that if the correct policy is implemented, countries like Indonesia can make considerable contributions to global carbon fluxes.

The UN estimate deforestation and forest degradation to make up 17% of global carbon emissions, which makes it the second most polluting sector, following the energy industry. The cost of this globally is estimated to total $42 billion. Therefore, in recent years, there has been more focus on the importance of mangroves, with initiatives being developed to use reforestation as a mitigation tool for climate change.

Reducing Emissions from Deforestation and Forest Degradation 
In 2008, the United Nations launched the "Reducing Emissions from Deforestation and forest Degradation (REDD)" program to combat climate change through the reduction of carbon emissions and enhancement of carbon sinks from forests. It is the opinion of literary scholars that the REDD program can increase carbon sequestration from mangroves and therefore reduce carbon in the atmosphere. The REDD+ mechanism, as part of the REDD program, provides financial support to stakeholders in developing countries to avoid deforestation and forest degradation. The estimated impacts of REDD+ globally, could reach up to 2.5 billion tons of CO2 each year. An examples of REDD+ implementation can be seen in Thailand, where carbon markets give farmers incentive to conserve mangrove forests, by compensating for the opportunity cost of shrimp farming.

Mangroves for the Future 
Moreover, the Mangroves for the Future (MFF) initiative, led by IUCN and UNDP, encourages the rehabilitation of mangroves by engaging with local stakeholders and creating a platform for change. In Indonesia, one project planted 40,000 mangroves, which then encouraged local government to take up similar initiatives on a larger scale. Mangrove restoration and protection is also seen as a climate change mitigation strategy under COP21, the international agreement to target climate change, with countries being able to submit the act in their Nationally Appropriate Mitigation Approaches (NAMAs). Ten of the world's least developed countries are now prioritizing mangrove restoration in their NAMAs.

Climate change adaptation 
As well as providing the benefit of a carbon sinks, mangroves also host potential for climate change adaptation. They provide protection to local communities from sea level rise, coastal erosion, storms, and storm surge or storm flooding. The main climate change concerns for the future of mangroves are sea level rise, decreased cold weather events or global temperature rise, and increased storm severity and weather patterns. Mangroves are naturally durable and adaptable species but the impacts of climate change will alter the mangroves habitat and depending on the severity of the impacts the mangrove will attempt to adapt the best it can. Sea level changes have caused mangroves to adapt in way of mobilizing; depending on the geographic location and local topography mangroves will adjust to survive impending water level changes. Sea level rise increase in relation to forest floor elevation is a good determinate to the future of mangrove adaption. If a mangrove forest floor rises at a rate exceeding the local rate of sea level rise, it is predicted that other local plant species will invade the spaces mangroves migrate away from, replacing them. When the forests move inland, intertidal flats and banks are predicted to spread out seawards that can allow for mangroves to repopulate the area and support expansion in the future. If the forest floor rising rate is equal to sea level rise then the forest can survive and remain stable. If the forest floor rising rate is slower than the rate of sea level rise, the forest will sink into the coast and drown, mangroves will move to invade land that has been changed by erosion and tidal patterns. In the IPCC AR5 report, the potential of ecosystem-based adaptation (EBA) to climate change is discussed, which includes the restoration of mangroves. An example of this can be seen in Bangladesh, where the government initiated the plantation of 50,000 hectares of mangrove forest to stabilize coastal areas, in an attempt to tackle increasing erosion. Evidence suggests that this initiative was successful in increasing accretion of coastal sediment, which reduced coastal erosion in this area and protects coastal communities from flooding and storm events. It has also been found that areas surrounding mangrove forests are subject to less damage from cyclones than nonforested areas. Information gathered from a Climate Change Report study, for impacts climate change have on mangrove forests in 2015, predicted regional changes in salinity, precipitation, and sea level rise for 2081-2100 (relative to the 1986-2005 reference period) this predicted that mangrove forests in the United States will continue to expand their latitudinal ranges as temperature, sea level and atmospheric  concentrations increase.

Other concerns

Stakeholder engagement
An important but often overlooked aspect of mangrove restoration efforts is the role that the local communities play as stakeholders in the process and the outcome. Since they may directly feel the effects of restoration projects, they should be involved in the process as much as feasibly possible, from decision-making to maintenance over the long term. Their involvement and local knowledge, as well as collaboration with other stakeholders such as sponsors and governing agencies, is crucial to the success of restoration projects.

Soil degradation
In some areas, restoration may be prohibitively difficult due to the degradation of the soil that regularly follows the clear-cutting of mangrove forests. Common effects include advanced erosion of the soil, loss of nutrients, high levels of salinity, and/or buildup of toxins. However, even without this extent of degradation, the soil may become unable to host plant life at all due to the loss of the live mangrove roots, which exuded oxygen and carbohydrate into the soil and maintained its quality. Using foresight early in the restoration process to carefully select sites that are likely to succeed as self-maintaining ecosystems, as well as ensuring that proper management is built into the conservation effort, can prevent the waste of time and energy that often accompanies restoration projects. The long-lasting aftereffects of mangrove degradation underscore the importance of eliminating its causes, since once sites are cleared, it is difficult for them to recover without a scientific intervention.

See also

UN Decade on Ecosystem Restoration
Reforestation

References

Sources
Food and Agriculture Organization of the United Nations, Rome. "The world's mangroves 1980-2005. A Thematic Study Prepared in the Framework of the Global Forest Resources Assessment 2005", FAO Forestry Paper 153, 2007.
Forest Service Manual. "Ecological Restoration and Resilience", National Forest Resource Management, Chapter 2020, 2000. 
Intergovernmental Panel on Climate Change. "IPCC Fourth Assessment Report. Climate Change 2001. Working Group II: Impacts, Adaptation and Vulnerability". 19.3.3.5, Mangrove Ecosystems. 
Lewis, Roy R. "Mangrove Field of Dreams: If We Build It, Will They Come?", Society of Wetland Scientists Research Brief. Wetland Science and Practice. 27(1):15-18, 2009. 
Lewis, Roy R. "Methods and criteria for successful mangrove forest restoration", Chapter 28, pp. 787–800 in G.M.E. Perillo, E. Wolanski, D. R. Cahoon, and M.M. Brinson (eds.) "Coastal Wetlands: An Integrated Ecosystem Approach". Elsevier Press, 2009. 
Millennium Ecosystem Assessment. "Ecosystems and Human Well-Being: Wetlands and Water Synthesis", World Resources Institute, Washington, DC, 2005. 
Quarto, Alfredo, Mangrove Action Project. "Ecological Mangrove Restoration (EMR) and Training Project. Concept Note for EMR Workshops in Asia and Latin America", 2010.
Wetlands International. "Ecological Mangrove Restoration in Thailand", 2012. 
Mangrove Restoration.com

Bioremediation
Conservation biology
Ecological restoration
Landscape ecology
Mangroves